The Best of Paul Overstreet is the first compilation album by the American country music artist of the same name. It released on February 15, 1994 via RCA Records.

Track listing

Chart performance

References

1994 compilation albums
Paul Overstreet albums
Albums produced by James Stroud
RCA Records compilation albums